Mutual Film Corporation was an early American film conglomerate that produced some of Charlie Chaplin's greatest comedies. Founded in 1912, it was absorbed by Film Booking Offices of America, which evolved into RKO Pictures.

Founding 
Mutual's predecessor film businesses began with the partnership behind the Western Film Exchange, founded in Milwaukee, Wisconsin in July 1906. The partnership included Harry E. Aitken, Roy Aitken, and John R. Freuler. In 1910, Freuler also formed a partnership with Chicago film distributor Samuel S. Hutchinson, establishing a production entity known as the American Film Manufacturing Company.

In early 1912 the Shallenberger brothers (Wilbert E. and William Edgar), Crawford Livingston, and others as investors including Charles J. Hite, the President & CEO of Thanhouser Film Corporation, joined Freuler and Harry E. Aitken in the formation of Mutual Film. Mutual Film Corporation was formed in 1912 by a group of American businessmen including Harry E. Aitken.

A releasing and distribution company, Mutual also had numerous subsidiary production units, including Keystone Studios, famed producer of comedies. Mutual is celebrated for signing Charlie Chaplin in 1916; he produced some of his best comedies while working for the company., although he felt that the company's tight production schedules led to the films becoming increasingly formulaic. As a result of this concern, Chaplin went with First National Pictures to have a contract that allowed him more flexibile production schedules so he could focus on making better films. 

As 1912 progressed, the company included auxiliary units such as Keystone Studios, the Majestic Studios (which would later become the Reliance-Majestic Studios through Harry Aitken's partnership with D. W. Griffith), and the New York Motion Picture Company.

In 1915, the workers of Keystone Studios,  Kay-Bee Studios (a subsidiary of the New York Motion Picture Company) and Reliance-Majestic Studio left Mutual, along with the Aitken brothers, to form the Triangle Film Corporation.  Now as complete owners of the former Reliance-Majestic Studio, by 1917 the conglomerate operated as the distributor for four subsidiary studios in California, three of which were in the Los Angeles area and the other in Santa Barbara. They were Signal Film Corporation, Vogue Films, Inc., Lone Star Film Company and American Film Company. Vogue Films, Inc. operated a studio at Santa Monica Boulevard and Gower street in Los Angeles producing two-reel comedy films exclusively. Among the other subsidiaries of the New York Motion Picture Company were: 101-Bison Company, Broncho Film Company, & Domino Film Company.

Legal cases
In 1915, the United States Supreme Court ruled in Mutual Film Corporation v. Industrial Commission of Ohio that motion pictures were a form of business, not an art form, and therefore not covered by the First Amendment. Shortly after this decision, cities began to pass ordinances banning the public exhibition of "immoral" films, concerning the major studios that state or federal regulations would soon follow. This ruling remained in effect until Joseph Burstyn, Inc v. Wilson in 1952 which declared that film was a legitimate artistic medium with free speech protections.

Productions 
In 1916, Charlie Chaplin became the highest paid entertainer in the world when he signed a contract with Mutual for a salary of $670,000 per year. Mutual built Chaplin his very own studio and allowed him total freedom to make twelve two-reel films during this fruitful twelve-month period. Chaplin subsequently recognised this period of film-making as the most inventive and liberating of his career, although he also had concerns that the films produced were increasingly formulaic during the length of his contract.

During 1916 and 1917, the Lone Star Film Company had Charlie Chaplin working at their studio at 1025 Lillian Way, in Hollywood. Charlie Chaplin moved on to found United Artists in 1919 with Mary Pickford, D. W. Griffith, and Douglas Fairbanks. In 1918, Mutual Film Corporation ceased production. Like many other companies established at this time, Mutual was eventually absorbed by larger corporations, in this case Film Booking Offices of America and later RKO Radio Pictures.

With the exception of the Chaplin films, most of the Mutual shorts and feature dramas are lost to time and decomposition.

Selected filmography

References

Bibliography
Robert S. Birchard, "Silent-Era Filmmaking in Santa Barbara"  Charleston: Arcadia Publishing, 2007

External links

 Mutual Film Corporation at the AFI Catalog of Feature Films

Entertainment companies established in 1912
Mass media companies established in 1912
Mass media companies disestablished in 1918
 
Silent film studios
American silent films by studio
Film studios in Southern California
Defunct American film studios
Companies based in Los Angeles
Entertainment companies based in California
1912 establishments in California
1918 disestablishments in California
Defunct companies based in Greater Los Angeles
1910s in California
Articles containing video clips
Film production companies of the United States